Verkine Karakashian (1856–1933) was an Ottoman-Armenian actress and soprano.

Verkine Karakashian was born in Constantinople, today Istanbul, in 1856. She was the younger sister of actress Yeranuhi Karakashian. She debuted on the stage at Aziziye Theater in Üsküdar, Istanbul in 1869. Firstly, she entered the theater company of Güllü Agop. She later performed as soprano at the operetta company of Serovpe Benliyan. Following her marriage in 1914, she retired from the stage and lived in Symirna, today İzmir. She died in Athens, Greece in 1933.

Bibliography

1856 births
Actresses from Istanbul
Armenians from the Ottoman Empire
19th-century actresses from the Ottoman Empire
19th-century Armenian actors
20th-century actresses from the Ottoman Empire
20th-century Armenian actors
Ethnic Armenian actresses
Stage actresses from the Ottoman Empire
Armenian operatic sopranos
1933 deaths
20th-century Armenian women opera singers
19th-century Armenian women singers